Trachyliopus multifasciculatus is a species of beetle in the family Cerambycidae. It was described by Austrian entomologist Stephan von Breuning in 1940.

References

Crossotini
Beetles described in 1940